Hinduism in Samoa has had a small presence, constituted mainly by migrants from Fiji. The number of Hindus, like the number of Muslims, fluctuates repeatedly. As of the 2006 Samoan Census, there were 25 Hindus.

More than 55% of Hindus are concentrated in Faleata West.

Growth and demographics
Hinduism in Samoa began in the late 20th century, though natural disasters have made some of the fewer than 100 Hindus emigrate. Hinduism was not in the 2001 Census, possibly because it did not have any adherents at the time, unlike Muslims (48). Hinduism was added in the 2006 Census, which stated that there were 25 Hindus, 12 being male and 13 female. Due to smaller numbers, the Muslim and Hindu population count was merged in the 2011 Census, with the total now being 38 adherents. The 2011 Census stated that of the 38 Muslims/Hindus, 25 were male and 13 female. This gender imbalance, which has inflated the proportion of male to females, may have been a consequence of the 2009 Samoa earthquake and tsunami, when more than 150 people died and many emigrated.

In 2016 the religion claimed more than a thousand followers across Samoa.

References

Samoa
Religion in Samoa
Samoa